Maisie Adam (born 24 January 1994) is an English stand-up comedian, writer and actress.

Early life
Maisie Adam grew up in Pannal, North Yorkshire, with her parents Phillip and Jill Adam, and her younger brother Daniel. At 14, she was diagnosed with juvenile myoclonic epilepsy. 

Adam attended St Aidan's Church of England High School in Harrogate, where she was Head Girl. She trained with the National Youth Theatre in 2010 and 2012 and went on to study acting at the East 15 Acting School in Southend on Sea. She graduated with a BA in Acting & Community Theatre in 2016.

Adam's mother, Jill Adam, used to work for Leeds Beckett University and is the founder and executive director of the Louder Than Words Festival in Manchester.

Career
A trained actress, Adam initially planned on acting and writing professionally. She won a Laurence Marks sitcom-writing mentorship in 2015.

Stand-up comedy
After graduating, Adam did not have an agent and had difficulty finding acting jobs. She moved back in with her parents in Yorkshire and worked various temp jobs. This led her to try stand-up, with her first gig at the Ilkley Literature Festival fringe on 13 October 2016  with a one-hour show called Living on the Edge. In 2017, Adam won the national contest So You Think You're Funny for new stand-up acts at the Edinburgh Fringe Festival. Winning the contest led to her getting signed with an agent.

Adam's first full-length Edinburgh solo show, Vague, was nominated for the Best Newcomer Award at the 2018 Edinburgh Comedy Awards. In that year, she won the Amused Moose National New Comic Award. Adam returned to the Edinburgh Fringe in 2019 with her show Hang Fire, which she took on a UK and European tour in 2019/2020.

Television
Adam first appeared as a contestant on The Chase while she was a University student in April 2016. There, she was eliminated by Paul Sinha in her head-to-head round with him.

Following her television appearance as a comedian on ITV2's The Stand-Up Sketch Show in February 2019, Adam has appeared on episodes of 8 Out of 10 Cats, Mock the Week, QI, Have I Got News for You, Would I Lie To You?, Richard Osman's House of Games, Roast Battle, and The Last Leg. She has written for Never Mind The Buzzcocks and in 2019 she was a writer on two episodes of Rob Beckett's Savage Socials on Channel 4. Additionally, Adam has portrayed Siouxsie Sioux in a 2018 episode of Urban Myths, titled "The Sex Pistols Vs. Bill Grundy".

In 2021, she narrated the reality show, The Cabins, which first aired on 4 January 2021 on ITV2. A second series was renewed and aired on 3 January 2022. In June 2022, ITV had announced that The Cabins would not return for its third series and just two series were produced. 

In November 2022, Adam appeared in the new series of Outsiders on Dave. In December 2022, she was on Big Fat Quiz of the Year as a panelist with Katherine Ryan.

Podcast 
Since December 2019, Adam has hosted a podcast, That's a First!, with fellow comedian Tom Lucy.

Personal life
Adam lives in Brighton. She is currently engaged to Mike Dobinson as of December 2021. She plays for a football team in Brighton and is also a Leeds United fan.

Adam, during lockdown, had her hair cut, to The Chelsea, a fringed bob from the front yet from the back it is an undercut.

References

External links
 Official website
 

English women comedians
Living people
1994 births
People from the Borough of Harrogate
21st-century English comedians